Archbishop Mesrob I Naroyan (in Armenian Մեսրոպ Նարոյան) (1875 – 30 May 1944) was the 80th Armenian Patriarch of Constantinople under the authority of the Catholicos of Armenia and of all Armenians. He was elected to the position in 1927 and served for 16 years as Patriarch until his death.

Mesrob I Naroyan of Constantinople
Mesrob I Naroyan of Constantinople
Mesrob I Naroyan of Constantinople
Mesrob I Naroyan of Constantinople
Armenians from the Ottoman Empire
20th-century Oriental Orthodox bishops